The bombesin receptor subtype 3 also known as BRS-3 or BB3 is a protein which in humans is encoded by the BRS3 gene.

Function 

Mammalian bombesin-like peptides are widely distributed in the central nervous system as well as in the gastrointestinal tract, where they modulate smooth-muscle contraction, exocrine and endocrine processes, metabolism, and behavior. They bind to G protein-coupled receptors on the cell surface to elicit their effects. Bombesin-like peptide receptors include gastrin-releasing peptide receptor, neuromedin B receptor, and bombesin-like receptor-3 (BRS3; this article).

BB3 is a G protein-coupled receptor.  BB3 only interacts with known naturally occurring bombesin-related peptides with low affinity and therefore, as it has no natural high-affinity ligand, is classified as an orphan receptor.

References

Further reading

External links
 
 
 

G protein-coupled receptors